Tennant is a census-designated place (CDP) in Siskiyou County, California, United States.  Its population is 63 as of the 2020 census, up from 41 from the 2010 census.

Geography
Tennant is located at  (41.585003, -121.911794).

Climate
This region experiences warm (but not hot) and dry summers, with no average monthly temperatures above 71.6 °F.  According to the Köppen Climate Classification system, Tennant has a warm-summer Mediterranean climate, abbreviated "Csb" on climate maps.

Demographics

2010
The 2010 United States Census reported that Tennant had a population of 41. The racial makeup of Tennant was 36 (87.8%) White, 0 (0.0%) African American, 2 (4.9%) Native American, 0 (0.0%) Asian, 0 (0.0%) Pacific Islander, 1 (2.4%) from other races, and 2 (4.9%) from two or more races. Hispanic or Latino of any race were 4 persons (9.8%).

The Census reported that 41 people (100% of the population) lived in households, 0 (0%) lived in non-institutionalized group quarters, and 0 (0%) were institutionalized.

There were 27 households, out of which 1 (3.7%) had children under the age of 18 living in them, 8 (29.6%) were opposite-sex married couples living together, 0 (0%) had a female householder with no husband present, 2 (7.4%) had a male householder with no wife present.  There were 1 (3.7%) unmarried opposite-sex partnerships, and 0 (0%) same-sex married couples or partnerships. 15 households (55.6%) were made up of individuals, and 8 (29.6%) had someone living alone who was 65 years of age or older. The average household size was 1.52.  There were 10 families (37.0% of all households); the average family size was 2.00.

The population was spread out, with 1 people (2.4%) under the age of 18, 1 people (2.4%) aged 18 to 24, 6 people (14.6%) aged 25 to 44, 21 people (51.2%) aged 45 to 64, and 12 people (29.3%) who were 65 years of age or older.  The median age was 59.5 years. For every 100 females, there were 156.3 males.  For every 100 females age 18 and over, there were 150.0 males.

The homeowner vacancy rate was 0%; the rental vacancy rate was 0%.  31 people (75.6% of the population) lived in owner-occupied housing units and 10 people (24.4%) lived in rental housing units.

2000
As of the census of 2000, there were 63 people, 34 households, and 17 families residing in the CDP. The racial makeup of the CDP was 88.89% White, 1.59% Native American, 3.17% from other races, and 6.35% from two or more races. Hispanic or Latino of any race were 11.11% of the population.

There were 34 households, out of which 8.8% had children under the age of 18 living with them, 38.2% were married couples living together, 11.8% had a female householder with no husband present, and 50.0% were non-families. 44.1% of all households were made up of individuals, and 26.5% had someone living alone who was 65 years of age or older. The average household size was 1.85 and the average family size was 2.53.

In the CDP, the population was spread out, with 12.7% under the age of 18, 3.2% from 18 to 24, 17.5% from 25 to 44, 36.5% from 45 to 64, and 30.2% who were 65 years of age or older. The median age was 56 years. For every 100 females, there were 80.0 males. For every 100 females age 18 and over, there were 83.3 males.

The median income for a household in the CDP was $10,750, and the median income for a family was $26,250. Males had a median income of $21,250 versus $0 for females. The per capita income for the CDP was $9,929. There were 31.3% of families and 34.8% of the population living below the poverty line, including 100.0% of under eighteens and 8.3% of those over 64.

100% of the population speaks English.

Politics

References

Mount Shasta
Census-designated places in Siskiyou County, California
Census-designated places in California